or California maki is an uramaki (inside-out makizushi roll) containing crab (or imitation crab), avocado, and cucumber. Sometimes crab salad is substituted for the crab stick, and often the outer layer of rice is sprinkled with toasted sesame seeds or roe (such as tobiko from flying fish).

As one of the most popular styles of sushi in Canada and the United States, the California roll has been influential in sushi's global popularity, and in inspiring sushi chefs around the world to create non-traditional fusion cuisine.

Ingredients 

The main wrapped ingredients are the avocado and crab meat, or imitation crab (surimi crab), and the optional mayonnaise; these are all typically wrapped with seaweed, although soy paper can be used. The cucumber may have been used since the beginning, or added later, depending on the account. The inside-out roll may be sprinkled on the outside with sesame seeds, although tobiko (flying fish roe), or masago (capelin roe) may be used.

History
The identity of the creator of the California roll is disputed. Several chefs from Los Angeles have been cited as the dish's originator, as well as one chef from Vancouver, British Columbia.

The earliest mention in print of a 'California roll' was in the Los Angeles Times and an Ocala, Florida newspaper on November 25, 1979. Less than a month later an Associated Press story credited a Los Angeles chef named Ken Seusa at the Kin Jo sushi restaurant near Hollywood as its inventor. The AP article cited Mrs. Fuji Wade, manager of the restaurant, as its source for the claim. Food writer Andrew F. Smith observes that this claim stood uncontested for more than 20 years.

Others attribute the dish to Ichiro Mashita, another Los Angeles sushi chef from the former Little Tokyo restaurant "Tokyo Kaikan". According to this account, Mashita began substituting the toro (fatty tuna) with avocado in the off-season, and after further experimentation, developed the prototype, back in the 1960s (or early 1970s).

Accounts of these first 'California Rolls' describe a dish very different from the one today. Early California roll recipes used frozen king crab legs, since surimi imitation crab was not yet available locally and importing it was not convenient. One story, drawn directly from a firsthand source (namely Teruo Imaizumi, Mashita's assistant), was that in 1964, the pair developed a prototype which used cubed avocado, king crab, cucumber and ginger, made into a hand-roll (rather than makizushi rolled using a makisu). Other food writers state that the cucumber, mayonnaise, and sesame seed were originally missing, and these ingredients were only added later. The early California roll was wrapped traditional style, with the nori seaweed on the outside, which American customers tended to peel off. Therefore, the roll "inside-out", i.e., uramaki version was eventually developed. This adaptation has also been credited to Mashita by figures associated with the restaurant.

Japanese-born chef Hidekazu Tojo, a resident of Vancouver since 1971, claimed he created the California roll at his restaurant in the late 1970s. Tojo insists he is the innovator of the "inside-out" sushi, and it got the name "California roll" because its contents of crab and avocado were abbreviated to C.A., which is the abbreviation for the state of California. Because of this splendid coincidence, Tojo was set on the name California Roll. According to Tojo, he single-handedly created the California roll at his Vancouver restaurant, including all the modern ingredients of cucumber, cooked crab, and avocado. However, this conflicts with many food historian's accounts, which describe a changing, evolving dish that emerged in the Los Angeles area.  In 2016 the Japanese Ministry of Agriculture, Forestry and Fisheries named Tojo a goodwill ambassador for Japanese cuisine.

Regardless of who invented it, after becoming a favorite in southern California the dish became popular all across the United States by the 1980s. The California roll was featured by Gourmet magazine in 1980, and taken up by a restaurant critic for The New York Times the following year. The roll contributed to sushi's growing popularity in the United States by easing diners into more exotic sushi options. Sushi chefs have since devised many kinds of rolls, beyond simple variations of the California roll.

See also

Notes

References

Bibliography

American fusion cuisine
Canadian cuisine
Food and drink in California
Japanese fusion cuisine
Sushi in the United States
Avocado dishes
Cucumber dishes
Cuisine of British Columbia